Kalipatnam is a village in West godavari district of the Indian state Andhra Pradesh. Lankalakoderu railway Station, Narasapur railway Station are the nearest railway stations.

Geography

Demographics 
 Census of India, Kalipatnam had a population of 11839. The total population constitute, 5832 males and 6007 females with a sex ratio of 1030 females per 1000 males. 1183 children are in the age group of 0–6 years, with sex ratio of 975. The average literacy rate stands at 68.00%.

References

Villages in West Godavari district